Oberstockensee is a small lake in the Canton of Bern, Switzerland. The lake is located above the village of Erlenbach im Simmental, below Stockhorn.
During the 19th and 20th centuries, the "Oberstockensee" was often called the Vorderstockensee and/or Spetbaerglisee. Local residents still refer to it as the "Spetbaerglisee."  Vorderstocken and Spetbaergli are the two alpine meadows that are on opposite sides of the lake.

Drowning incidents
Five people drowned in the "Oberstockensee" in a tragic accident on Sunday, 1 August 1869 (the Swiss national "Independence Day" holiday) on Mt. Stockhorn: 
• Johann Gottfried Batzli (1830-1869), the president of the Erlenbach im Simmental Community Council, who only shortly before had been the miller and baker at the lower mill on the "Wildenbach" creek in the village and was long remembered because of his winning personality and his friendly, gentle voice 
• Johannes Batzli (1862-1869), the seven-year-old orphaned son of a first cousin of the community council president 
• Rudolf Jutzeler (1853-1869), a sixteen-year-old godson of Susanna Katharina Buehler Zurbruegg (1800-1859), the mother-in-law of Johann Gottfried Batzli
• David Sulzener Jr. (1851-1869), an eighteen-year-old hired hand working for the Batzli brothers on the "Hinterstocken" alpine pasture
• Samuel Tschabold (1853-1869), the sixteen-year-old son of Jakob Tschabold Jr. (b. 1806), who had been working with his father on the "Spetbaergli" alpine pasture.

Although hardly any specific details are known that caused the deathly course of events, oral history reports agree that the little boat set out on the east side of the lake below the "Oberstocken" alpine pasture heading for the herdsmen′s little hut on the "Spetbaergli" pastures on the west side of the lake.

Susanna Katharina Zurbruegg Batzli (1829-1901), who had been with her husband on the "Hinterstocken" alpine pasture chose not to accompany the men in their little boat. Picking wild flowers as she walked along the rocky narrow pathway (locally known as "the evil footpath"), she even heard her husband call to her that it was a pity that she had not joined them on the lovely boat-ride.

Not long thereafter, the community council president′s wife saw the overturned boat and young Johannes′ straw hat on the little lake only a short distance from their destination. Those sparse facts support the presumption that the boy′s hat had fallen into the water. When he leaned over the edge of the boat to try and fetch his hat, some of the men tried to deter him. The boat lost its equilibrium and quickly overturned. That assumption seemed valid, particularly when amended with the fact that five persons simply overloaded such a small rowing boat.

Upon learning of the tragedy, Erlenbach Pastor Ludwig Wilhelm Bernhard Huerner (1827-1903) and village schoolmaster [NN] Saegesser immediately hiked up the mountain to the site of the accident. On Monday gunsmith Johann Jakob Rieder II (1823-1875) joined with them to dredge the lake in search of the bodies. While Huerner and Saegesser rowed the boat, Rieder handled the long rope to which a three-pronged hook resembling a small anchor was attached. It was a taxing ordeal for the three of them as they went back and forth over the area which Jakob Tschabold pointed out as being the actual scene of the accident. After a lengthy search, they found one corpse and then another, until the last body was finally recovered on Thursday.

On Saturday, 7 August 1869, the Reverend Huerner presided over the moving funeral service in Erlenbach i.S. for the five persons. The pastor personally chiseled the five names on the commemorative gravestone near the entrance of the Erlenbach churchyard.

The name of Adele Batzli (1898-1999) – a grandniece of Erlenbach Community Council president Johann Gottfried Batzli – appears at the bottom of the gravestone below the names of the five persons who drowned. She donated money to keep up the grave in the churchyard and was therefore allowed to also be buried there and have her name added to the marker.

The surnames Batzli and Jutzeler were spelled on the commemorative gravestone without the letter "t" in their names, a variation typical of the local Bernese dialect in the Simmental valley. However, two distinct errors remain inexplicable:
• The seven-year-old boy who drowned was named Johannes Batzli and not Johann Friedrich ("Joh. Frd. ") as chiseled on the gravestone. Johann Friedrich Batzli Sr., referenced above as "a first cousin of the community council president," was the father of the boy. Little Johannes′ elder brother was Johann Friedrich Batzli Jr. (b. 1860). In the Daerstetten Citizens′ Registers he is recorded as having renounced his Swiss citizenship upon becoming naturalized in "Jefferson" in the USA in 1892.
• According to the Daerstetten Christening Register (1843–75), Rudolf Jutzeler′s correct date of birth is 29 March 1853.

See also
List of mountain lakes of Switzerland

Lakes of Switzerland
Bernese Oberland
Lakes of the canton of Bern